All I See Is You may refer to:

All I See Is You (film), a 2016 American psychological drama
"All I See Is You", 1966 hit song by Dusty Springfield; see Dusty Springfield discography